Smart Computing was a monthly computing and technology magazine published by Sandhills Publishing Company in Lincoln, Nebraska, USA.  First released under the name PC Novice, it was published from 1990 to 2013.

Content
The magazine featured articles, reviews of hardware and software, editorial content and classified advertising. It was geared more toward newer users than its sister publications, Computer Power User and CyberTrend (previously known as PC Today).

Articles and Features
Technology News and Notes, by Christian Perry - News and a monthly Q/A help desk
Tech Diaries, various authors - Reviews
Software Head-to-Head, various authors - a comparison of software
September 2006: Anti-Spam: , SonicWALL Email Security Desktop, OnlyMyEmail, VQme Anti Spam with Webmail. Winner: SonicWALL Email Security Desktop
October 2006: Instant Messaging clients: Yahoo! Messenger 8, AIM Triton 1.5, Google Talk, ICQ 5.1, Trillian 3.1, Windows Live Messenger. Winner: Yahoo! Messenger
January 2007: Office suites: StarOffice 8, Microsoft Office 2007 Home and Student Edition, Corel WordPerfect X3 Standard Edition, Ability Office Standard Edition. Winner: StarOffice 8
Software Reviews, various
Staff Picks, various - staff's choices of hardware
Windows Tips & Tricks, various - helpful hints for using Microsoft Windows
General Computing, various - articles about no specific topic
Reader's Tips, by readers - readers give hints to other readers
Learning Linux, by Vince Cogley, NEW COLUMN - teach yourself using Linux with the Ubuntu distribution
Plugged In, various - tips on using the Internet
Mr. Modem's Desktop, by Mr. Modem - various tips and Internet links
Quick Studies, various - tips on and fixing problems with using very commonly used software
Tidbits, by Marty Sems - information on new stuff
Tech Support, various - consists of:
What to Do When... - a guide on fixing road-block problems
Examining Errors - the magazine helps readers with errors
Fast Fixes - information on new software updates
Q&A - answers to tech support questions
FAQ - answers to frequently asked questions; each month all questions are about the same topic
Action Editor, unknown - Action Editor comes to the rescue when companies deny service or give bad service
Tales From The Trenches, by Gregory Anderson - his bad experiences when using computers and what to do about them if they happen to you
Editorial License, by Rod Scher - description unknown

See also
Computer magazines

References

External links

Publisher's website

1990 establishments in Nebraska
2013 disestablishments in Nebraska
Monthly magazines published in the United States
Defunct computer magazines published in the United States
Home computer magazines
Magazines established in 1990
Magazines disestablished in 2013
Magazines published in Nebraska
Mass media in Lincoln, Nebraska